"I Feel Possessed" is a rock song written by Neil Finn and performed by Australian band Crowded House for their album Temple of Low Men.  The song was the final single released from the album. The song later appeared on the group's greatest hits collection Recurring Dream.

Track listing
All live performances feature Roger McGuinn of The Byrds (the union was named "ByrdHouse"). Recorded at the Pantages Theatre, Los Angeles 7 April 1989. All other tracks from the album "The Temple of Low Men".

Standard 7" vinyl
Released in Germany and Australia.
"I Feel Possessed" - 3:47
"Mr. Tambourine Man" - 2:35 (live)

Canada 7" vinyl
"I Feel Possessed" - 3:47
"Into Temptation" - 4:33

Standard EP
Released as 12" in Germany. Released as CD in US and Germany.
"I Feel Possessed" - 3:47
"Mr. Tambourine Man" - 2:35 (live)
"Eight Miles High" - 4:50 (live)
"So You Want to Be a Rock 'n' Roll Star" 2:49 (live)

Personnel
 Neil Finn - Vocals and guitar
 Nick Seymour - Bass guitar
 Paul Hester - Drums and backing vocals
 Mitchell Froom - Keyboards

Charts

Notes

1988 songs
Crowded House songs
Songs written by Neil Finn
Song recordings produced by Mitchell Froom
1990 singles
Capitol Records singles